Thabo Mooki affectionately nicknamed Tsiki-Tsiki (born 22 October 1974 in Soweto, Gauteng) is a retired South African association football midfielder who spent all his professional career with Premier Soccer League club Kaizer Chiefs. He also represented South Africa.

Club career
Mooki made nearly 350 appearances for Kaizer Chiefs in a 15-year career. Known as Tsiki Tsiki, he made his professional debut for Kazier Chiefs under manager Philippe Troussier in 1994.

International career
Mooki made his full international debut in a friendly against the Netherlands on 4 June 1997.

He was capped three times scoring one goal.

International goals

References

External links

1974 births
Living people
South African soccer players
South Africa international soccer players
1998 African Cup of Nations players
Association football midfielders
Kaizer Chiefs F.C. players
Sportspeople from Soweto